Susan Clymer (born 1951) is an American author of children's books.

Publications
Clymer has published fifteen books, eleven of them through Scholastic Corporation. She is perhaps best known for her Animals in Room 202 series, including There's a Hamster in my Lunchbox, There's a Frog in my Sleepingbag, There's a Tarantula in my Homework, and There's a Rabbit in my Backpack.

Residency
Clymer currently lives in Kansas. There she divides her time between writing and directing residencies as a visiting author in schools.

References

American children's writers
Living people
1951 births